Red Deer was a provincial electoral district in Alberta, Canada, mandated to return a single member to the Legislative Assembly of Alberta from 1905 to 1986.

The district was split into Red Deer North and Red Deer South in 1986.

History
Although an antecedent Red Deer district had existed in the Northwest Territories that covered much of central Alberta, it was split into Innisfail and Lacombe for the 1902 general election. Upon Alberta upon Alberta joining Confederation in September 1905, a smaller Red Deer district was created between Lacombe and Innisfail.

For most of the district's history, it was a swing riding, with no party being able win with a second representative until the Progressive Conservatives in the 1970s.

In the 1980s the city grew too large to be contained within a single electoral district, and Red Deer was split into Red Deer North and Red Deer South.

Members of the Legislative Assembly (MLAs)

Red Deer elected Liberal candidate John Moore as its first MLA in 1905 over the town's founder, Leonard Gaetz. However, he was defeated in 1909 by independent conservative candidate Edward Michener. Socialist candidate Donald McClure finished third.

Michener crossed the floor to the Conservative Party in 1910, becoming party leader and Leader of the Opposition. As party leader, he presided over a revival in Conservative fortunes in the 1913 election, but after losing to the Liberals again in 1917 he stepped down as leader. Prime Minister Robert Borden appointed him to the Senate in 1918, vacating the seat for Red Deer.

The ensuing by-election saw Leonard Gaetz' son John Gaetz, running for the Liberals unlike his father, triumph over the Conservative candidate. He served the rest of the term but was also defeated in the following election by United Farmers candidate and former mayor of Red Deer George Smith.

Smith defended the seat in the 1926 and 1930 elections despite strong challenges from Gaetz and Conservative candidate William Ernest Payne. However, Smith died suddenly in 1931, again vacating the seat. Payne was able to capture Red Deer for the Conservatives in the resulting by-election.

The 1935 election saw "Bible Bill" Aberhart's Social Credit sweep into power unexpectedly, with Alfred Hooke defeating Payne in Red Deer. After one term, Hooke chose to run in the new Rocky Mountain House district. He won the seat and stayed on as MLA until Social Credit's eventual defeat in 1971, serving in various cabinet positions.

However, the Red Deer seat was left open in 1940. Former Red Deer MP Alfred Speakman was jointly endorsed by the Liberals and Conservatives in what became known as the Independent Citizen's Association, officially running as an independent on the ballot, and managed to defeat the new Social Credit candidate to win the seat. He became the fifth member for Red Deer to serve only one term upon his death in 1943.

Social Credit candidate David Ure won the seat back for the government in a by-election in late 1943. He served three terms as MLA and Agriculture Minister until he, too, was killed in office by a traffic accident in 1953.

Conservative Cam Kirby picked the seat up in a 1954 by-election (defeating David Ure's younger brother, William Ure), and was re-elected in 1955. Despite winning the leadership of the newly-renamed Progressive Conservatives, however, Kirby lost to William Ure in 1959.

The younger Ure served as Red Deer MLA for three terms. Due to a boundary redistribution in 1971, he ran for re-election in Innisfail, but Social Credit lost both seats as the Progressive Conservatives swept to power. James Foster became MLA for Red Deer with the new government, and served two terms.

When he retired in 1979, Norman Magee defended the seat for the PCs, becoming the first Red Deer MLA from the same political party as his predecessor. Magee retired after one term and Jim McPherson served the final term for Red Deer before it was split in two in 1986. The new districts, Red Deer North and Red Deer South, continued to elect PC candidates until 2015, when both were won by the New Democrats.

Election results

1905 general election
The Returning Officer was Frank L. Farley.

1909 general election

1913 general election

1917 general election

1918 by-election

1921 general election

1926 general election

1930 general election

1935 general election

1940 general election

1943 by-election

1944 general election

1948 general election

1952 general election

1955 general election

1959 general election

1963 general election

1967 general election

1971 general election

1975 general election

1979 general election

1982 general election

Plebiscite results

1957 liquor plebiscite

On October 30, 1957 a stand-alone plebiscite was held province wide in all 50 of the then current provincial electoral districts in Alberta. The government decided to consult Alberta voters to decide on liquor sales and mixed drinking after a divisive debate in the Legislature. The plebiscite was intended to deal with the growing demand for reforming antiquated liquor control laws.

The plebiscite was conducted in two parts. Question A asked in all districts, asked the voters if the sale of liquor should be expanded in Alberta, while Question B asked in a handful of districts within the corporate limits of Calgary and Edmonton asked if men and woman were allowed to drink together in establishments.

Province wide Question A of the plebiscite passed in 33 of the 50 districts while Question B passed in all five districts. Red Deer voted in favour of the proposal with a solid majority. Voter turnout in the district was slightly under the province wide average of 46%.

Official district returns were released to the public on December 31, 1957. The Social Credit government in power at the time did not considered the results binding. However the results of the vote led the government to repeal all existing liquor legislation and introduce an entirely new Liquor Act.

Municipal districts lying inside electoral districts that voted against the Plebiscite were designated Local Option Zones by the Alberta Liquor Control Board and considered effective dry zones, business owners that wanted a license had to petition for a binding municipal plebiscite in order to be granted a license.

See also
List of Alberta provincial electoral districts
Red Deer, Alberta, a city in central Alberta

References

Further reading

External links

Former provincial electoral districts of Alberta
1905 establishments in Alberta
1986 disestablishments in Alberta
Politics of Red Deer, Alberta